Frank Meeink (born Francis Steven Bertoline; May 7, 1975) is a former white supremacist skinhead gang member in the United States. After a three-year stint in prison, he left the racist skinhead movement and now lectures against it.

Early life
Born in South Philadelphia, Meeink lived a violent and unpleasant childhood with a lack of a structured family. In his early life, he had no relationship with his biological father and had an abusive stepfather. Meeink's mother abused drugs and alcohol. As a teenager, Meeink was constantly bullied and taunted at school because his peers considered him to be an outcast. At age thirteen, Meeink was out with his cousin when he discovered the Neo-Nazi movement.

Life in prison
At 17, Meeink was arrested after he had nearly killed a man and had kidnapped another. Meeink used a gun in the kidnapping, which led to him being tried as an adult; he had recorded the attack on videotape. Meeink had also been arrested prior for smaller crimes, but for these crimes, however, he was sentenced to three years in prison. Meeink served his prison term near Springfield, Illinois.

Prison changed his life. He met people of many different ethnicities. Due to a shared interest in sports, Meeink became friends with many African American prisoners. In games like football and basketball, Meeink earned the respect of fellow African American inmates. Moreover, Meeink felt that the black inmates supported him more than the skinheads while in prison.

Life after prison 
After getting released from prison, Frank tried to return to his past life, but realized that during his time in prison he had learned that he did not have the same prejudices he had prior to prison. He also continued to suffer from not having a stable home and was almost lost to drug addiction.

The 1998 film, American History X, is loosely inspired by Meeink's life in many ways. The film's main character, Derek, played by Edward Norton, becomes a skinhead after his father is killed by black drug dealers and helps start a Neo-Nazi gang in Los Angeles. The character goes to prison for 3 years (like Meeink), for the murder of a black gang member. In prison, he too forms a bond with an African American inmate, and they share love of basketball, among other things. After he gets out of prison, he decides to leave the Nazi movement he helped form. Norton was nominated for an Academy Award for his performance.

After Meeink served his prison sentence, he went back to where he had spent his childhood in South Philadelphia and by helping with the local hockey team, the Philadelphia Flyers, he created Harmony Through Hockey. This organization was created to give young kids a chance to stay out of the way of violence and have fun while participating.

He also visits schools and gives lectures on his life and how to avoid falling into violence and crime.

During a March 2021 interview on CNN, Meeink commented on the effect of Fox News:
Fox News has completely radicalized so many Americans. If you look at Fox News and then you compare that to hate radio from Rwanda, and what started that civil war, there’s comparisons there. We have to know that a lot of our fellow Americans, our fellow children of God, have been radicalized by a network of news. As a former radical, I can tell you, from watching Fox News all day, I can show you where they’re saying radical stuff that I used to say...instead of when I would say “Jews,” they say “Big Media.” They just swapped out a couple of words here and there.

Notes 
 A 'Recovering Skinhead' On Leaving Hatred Behind. 7 April 2012. 27 January 2013 A 'Recovering Skinhead' On Leaving Hatred Behind.
 Meeink, Frank. Autobiography of Frank Meeink Students at Ashford University. 29 January 2013.
 Meeink, Frank. "A 'Recovering Skinhead' On Leaving Hatred Behind."  National Public Radio, 7 April 2010. Web. 3 February 2013.
 Powell, Caleb. American History X-treme. 16 March 2010. 27 January 2013 American History X-treme.
 Powell, Caleb. The Nervous Breakdown. 15 January 2011. 31 January 2013 The Frank Meeink Interview.

References 

Living people
Date of birth missing (living people)
Criminals from Philadelphia
1975 births
American anti-racism activists
American anti-fascists